Waldemar R. Röhrbein (9 September 19355 October 2014) was a German historian. He contributed to encyclopedias about Hanover's history and culture.

Life 
Born in Hanover, Röhrbein grew up in the rural . He studied history, English language and literature, education and philosophy at the universities of Göttingen and Hamburg. In the winter semester 1964/65 he was awarded his doctorate at the University of Göttingen with his thesis Hamburg und der hannoversche Verfassungskonflikt, 1837–1840. In 1965 he joined the museum service.

From 1976 up to his retirement in 1997, he was director of the Historisches Museum Hannover, the historical museum of Hanover, the capital of Lower Saxony. He managed to make the museum attractive to visitors, including pedagogical efforts to reach children. His creed was that visitors have to see what the past has to do with their own lives. ("Die Besucher müssen sehen, was die Vergangenheit mit ihrem eigenen Leben zu tun hat") He achieved national recognition when the museum became one of the first to hold large historical exhibitions dedicated to specific topics, such as Nazi seizure of power, Kristallnacht, and the bombing of the city.

From 1995 to 1997 he also directed the Museum August Kestner. From 1999 to 2004 he was president of Niedersächsischer Heimatbund.

After he retired, Röhrbein lived in Emden, dying there in 2014 at the age of 79.

Publications 
Röhrbein published on the history of Göttingen and Hannover and of Lower Saxony, and also on museums and the local history. Especially together with Klaus Mlynek, the long-time director of the Stadtarchiv Hannover, he was both editor and author of:

 1986: Der Maschsee in Hannover.
 Vol. 1: Von den Anfängen bis zum Beginn des 19. Jahrhunderts, 1992, 
 Vol. 2: Vom Beginn des 19. Jahrhunderts bis in die Gegenwart, 1994, 
 2001: 
 2002: 
 2009: .

Other works:
 Ausverkauf. the Marienburg Castle im Brennpunkt der Interessen. In Niedersachsen (Magazine for culture, history, home and nature since 1859), 2/2006, . The same text can be found with minor changes under the title Im Brennpunkt: Die Marienburg, in Förderverein für die Stadtgeschichte von Springe e. V.: Springer Jahrbuch 2006, .
 Kleine Stadtgeschichte Hannovers. (chronological narrative, 192 pages), Regensburg: Pustet, 2012, 
 with Hugo Thielen: Jüdische Persönlichkeiten in Hannovers Geschichte. Completely revised, extended and updated new edition, Hannover: Lutherisches Verlagshaus, 2013, 

First in 1998 and revised in 2013, Röhrbein and Hugo Thielen wrote a book about Jewish personalities in the history of Hanover, Jüdische Persönlichkeiten in Hannovers Geschichte. It is organised as a history of the city, beginning in 1303, with a focus on the contributions of Jewish personalities, rather than individual biographies. Around hundred persons are described in some detail, including the principal violinist of the court orchestra, Joseph Joachim. A second edition appeared in 2013, in commemoration of 75 years since the November pogroms.

References

Further reading 
 Simon Benne: Der große Erklärer / Trauer um einen bodenständigen Gelehrten: Der langjährige Museumsdirektor Waldemar Röhrbein ist tot. In Hannoversche Allgemeine Zeitung dated 7 October 2014, .
 Ernst Böhme: Nachruf auf Waldemar R. Röhrbein. In Göttinger Jahrbuch 62 (2014), p. 5f.

External links 
 
 

20th-century German historians
History of Lower Saxony
1935 births
2014 deaths
Writers from Hanover
Directors of museums in Germany
University of Göttingen alumni
University of Hamburg alumni
21st-century German historians